Mich Mich or Michmich or variation, may refer to:

 Mich-Mich, a fictional character from Speed Racer; see List of Speed Racer: The Next Generation characters
 Mish Mish, Akkar District, Akkar Governorate, Lebanon (also spelled Mich Mich)
 Mish Mish, Byblos District, Keserwan-Jbeil Governorate, Lebanon (also spelled Mich Mich)

See also

 Mich (disambiguation)
 Mishmish (disambiguation)
 Mish Mash (disambiguation)